Brachycorythis is a genus of flowering plants from the orchid family, Orchidaceae. It contains approximately 40-50 species native mostly to Africa and Madagascar but also some from South and East Asia (India, Thailand, China, etc.).

Species
Brachycorythis species accepted by the Plants of the World Online as of July 2021:

Brachycorythis acuta 
Brachycorythis angolensis 
Brachycorythis basifoliata 
Brachycorythis buchananii 
Brachycorythis congoensis 
Brachycorythis conica 
Brachycorythis disoides 
Brachycorythis friesii 
Brachycorythis galeandra 
Brachycorythis helferi 
Brachycorythis henryi 
Brachycorythis iantha 
Brachycorythis inhambanensis 
Brachycorythis kalbreyeri 
Brachycorythis laotica 
Brachycorythis lastii 
Brachycorythis mac-owaniana 
Brachycorythis macrantha 
Brachycorythis mixta 
Brachycorythis neglecta 
Brachycorythis obcordata 
Brachycorythis ovata 
Brachycorythis paucifolia 
Brachycorythis peitawuensis 
Brachycorythis pilosa 
Brachycorythis pleistophylla 
Brachycorythis pubescens 
Brachycorythis pumilio 
Brachycorythis rhodostachys 
Brachycorythis sceptrum 
Brachycorythis splendida 
Brachycorythis tanganyikensis 
Brachycorythis tenuior 
Brachycorythis thorelii 
Brachycorythis velutina 
Brachycorythis wightii 
Brachycorythis youngii

See also
 List of Orchidaceae genera

References

  (2001)  Orchidoideae (Part 1). Genera Orchidacearum 2: 265 ff. Oxford University Press.
  2005. Handbuch der Orchideen-Namen. Dictionary of Orchid Names. Dizionario dei nomi delle orchidee. Ulmer, Stuttgart

Orchideae
Orchideae genera
Orchids of Africa
Orchids of Madagascar
Orchids of India
Orchids of China
Orchids of Thailand